Established in 1967 by Dennis Cross, Gul produces watersports apparel. Products include wetsuits, jackets, bodyboards, buoyancy aids, and life jackets.

History

Gul was founded by Dennis Cross after realising there was a need for a solution to the cold Atlantic waters. After making a makeshift wetsuit, Cross decided to produce the suits on a larger and more professional scale.  This resulted in the establishment of the company in 1967.

Gul is credited with pioneering the first one-piece wetsuit in 1974/75. It was first nicknamed "the steamer" because of the steam given off from the suit once taken off allowing heat held inside to escape. Further expansion was given to the company when windsurfing was introduced in the mid-1970s, as wetsuits are ideal for the sport. Gul started to diversify in the 1980s when it introduced its first watch, and later moved into other watersports including sailing, kayaking, wakeboarding, kitesurfing, and more.

In 2015 the Gul brand was acquired by Sports Direct subsidiaries Gul IP Limited and Brand Holdings Limited.

Headquarters
In 1996 Gul moved to a new  factory in Bodmin costing around £2 million. In 2011 Gul moved to a nearby location of a smaller size.

References

External links
 

Clothing brands of the United Kingdom
Companies based in Cornwall
Clothing companies established in 1967
Sportswear brands
Surfwear brands
1967 establishments in England
Sports Direct